Richland Creek is a stream in Texas.

It is a tributary of the Trinity River and is partially dammed to create Richland Chambers Reservoir. The Dam changed the course of the river that previously ran south through the Richland Creek Wildlife Management Area. The redirection deprived the WMA of needed water so six pumping stations were installed.

See also
Trinity River tributaries
List of rivers of Texas

References

USGS Geographic Names Information Service
USGS Hydrologic Unit Map - State of Texas (1974)

Rivers of Texas
Trinity River (Texas)